Amblypneustes elevatus is a species of sea urchin of the family Temnopleuridae. Their armour is covered with spines. It came from the genus Amblypneustes and lives in the sea.

See also 
Agassizia scrobiculata
Allocentrotus fragilis
Amblypneustes formosus

References 

Amblypneustes
Animals described in 1872